The Rifleman's Creed (also known as My Rifle and The Creed of the United States Marine) is a part of basic United States Marine Corps doctrine. Major General William H. Rupertus wrote it during World War II following the attack on Pearl Harbor between late 1941 and early 1942, but its first publication was in San Diego in the Marine Corps Chevron on March 14, 1942. His reasoning for writing the Creed is believed to be that he felt that his men had to understand the concept "that the only weapon which stands between them and Death is the rifle…they must understand that their rifle is their life…" In the past, all enlisted Marines would learn the Creed at recruit training. However, in recent years the Creed has been relegated to the back pages of the standard recruit training guide book, and its memorization is no longer considered required for recruits, but its significance is passed through drill instructors to their recruits throughout each cycle. Different, more concise versions of the Creed have developed since its early days, but those closest to the original version remain the most widely accepted.

Purpose 

The Rifleman's Creed continues to stand as a pillar concerning the ethos of the Marine Corps. In recruit training for enlisted Marines and Officer Candidates School for commissioned officers the Rifleman's Creed is inescapable. Whilst its continued recitation varies from company to company, platoon to platoon, its presence is assured during the period of recruit training. The Rifleman's Creed is one of the keystones of the United States Marine Corps doctrine and helps designate that every Marine is, first and foremost, a Rifleman regardless of Military Occupational Specialty (or MOS) designation. Even now, in the United States Marine Corps rifle training data book, given to recruits when undertaking Table 1 of rifle qualification, the Rifleman's Creed is printed within the data book to ensure that prior to picking up a weapon a Marine understands what their rifle means to them and their Corps. The last page of the data book reinforces this ideology with the quote from General Alfred M. Gray Jr., the 29th Commandant of the Marine Corps: "Every Marine is, first and foremost, a rifleman. All other conditions are secondary." The Creed itself utilizes a sense of anthropomorphism in order to coerce Marines into seeing their rifle as more than a simple tool of war. This sense of almost familial attachment that a Marine feels towards their rifle is paramount, as a Marine would never leave a man behind, they would also not leave their rifle.

Current text

In popular culture 

 The Rifleman's Creed is used multiple times in Stanley Kubrick's 1987 film Full Metal Jacket including the now famous scene involving Private Pyle and his partial recitation of the Creed in the bathroom prior to his murder of Gunnery Sergeant Hartman and his subsequent suicide. Through Kubrick's continued use of the Rifleman's Creed throughout the first section of the film it represented the dehumanization of the recruits as a whole. Whilst the Creed represented the brainwashing of recruits into a singular Marine force it also borders on idolatry or a prayer within the context of the film. It became a sacred relic of the recruits and served as a chant of the ersatz religion that is the United States Marine Corps.
 The 2005 film Jarhead includes multiple scenes with a modified version of the Rifleman's Creed. The film's use of the Creed is often believed to be directly tied with its use in Full Metal Jacket. The Creed is introduced by Sergeant Sykes and reused in the film on multiple occasions and, whilst the entirety of the Creed is not used, it does succeed in alerting the audience to the motif-like element of the Creed's use in Full Metal Jacket.
 In the episode "Team Astrid" of the animated series Dragons: Race to the Edge, Astrid Hofferson trains her own team of dragon riders, using the words of the creed, but with "dragon" in place of "rifle."
 In the episode "Scope" of NCIS, Leroy Jethro Gibbs, himself a former Marine sniper, recites the creed to himself while lying in wait for another sniper.

See also
Airman's Creed
Coast Guardsmen's Creed
Noncommissioned officer's creed
Quartermaster Creed
Ranger Creed
Sailor's Creed
Soldier's Creed

References

United States Marine Corps lore and symbols
Warrior code
1941 documents
1942 documents